The Compact Kinetic Energy Missile (CKEM) was a developmental program to produce a hypersonic anti-tank guided missile for the U.S. Army. Lockheed Martin was the primary contractor. The program was the third in a series of projects based on kinetic energy missiles that stretches back to 1981's Vought HVM through the 1990s to 2000s LOSAT and finally to the CKEM.  The Army Aviation and Missile Command (AMCOM) developed this program as part of the Army's Future Combat Systems.  This missile was primarily an anti-tank weapon, and could be mounted on land vehicles and low-altitude aircraft.  The goal of these weapons was to demonstrate a state-of-the-art system for the next generation.  The program has since been cancelled.

Specifications

 Length: 
 Motor: Solid-fuel rocket
 Max range: 
 Max weight: 
 Velocity: 
 Warhead: Kinetic energy penetrator
 Penetrator energy:

Program status
 October 2003 – Lockheed Martin receives $21.3 million contract for CKEM Advanced Technology Demonstration (ATD) phase.
 September 2006 – The CKEM was successfully flight tested against a reinforced urban structure.
 February 2007 – A T-72 tank equipped with Explosive Reactive Armor was successfully engaged using CKEM at a range of 3400 meters. The test took place at Eglin Air Force Base, FL.

References

  Global Security

External links
 Lockheed Martin CKEM — Designation Systems
 Compact Kinetic Energy Missile (CKEM) — Global Security
 CKEM — Deagel
 Compact Kinetic Energy Missile CKEM — Defense Update

Anti-tank guided missiles of the United States